The women's 100 metres event at the 2000 World Junior Championships in Athletics was held in Santiago, Chile, at Estadio Nacional Julio Martínez Prádanos on 17 and 18 October.

Medalists

Results

Final
18 October
Wind: +2.0 m/s

Semifinals
18 October

Semifinal 1
Wind: 0.0 m/s

Semifinal 2
Wind: -1.5 m/s

Quarterfinals
17 October

Quarterfinal 1
Wind: +0.3 m/s

Quarterfinal 2
Wind: -0.5 m/s

Quarterfinal 3
Wind: +0.9 m/s

Heats
17 October

Heat 1
Wind: 0.0 m/s

Heat 2
Wind: +1.1 m/s

Heat 3
Wind: +0.2 m/s

Heat 4
Wind: -0.1 m/s

Heat 5
Wind: -1.1 m/s

Participation
According to an unofficial count, 36 athletes from 30 countries participated in the event.

References

100 metres
100 metres at the World Athletics U20 Championships